The 9×21mm pistol cartridge (also known as the 9×21mm IMI, 9mm IMI, 9x21mm Italian, or 9mm Italian) was designed by Jager (Loano, Italy), then adopted and commercialised by Israel Military Industries for those jurisdictions where military service cartridges, like the 9×19mm Parabellum, are or were illegal for civilian purchase (i.e. Italy, France, Brazil, and Mexico).

History
The bullet sits slightly deeper in the case, which results in almost the same overall length as the 9×19mm Parabellum cartridge.

The cartridge was designed by Mr. Giordano & Mr. Piscetta to be used for civil purposes with large pistols (also those designed for .45 ACP). It was named "9 mm GP". The users were not enthusiastic at the very beginning for several reasons, such as the fact that barrels had to be modified.

During the 1980s, Israel Military Industries (IMI) started to use 9×21mm and received permission to import the UZI Defender (also called Micro Uzi) into Italy chambered for 9×21 IMI. It was the first official commercial launch for the 9×21mm. From that period on several companies in Italy started to sell 9×21mm pistols and ammunition. In just a few decades, the 9×21mm GP or 9×21 IMI became roughly 80% of the civilian small arms market in Italy.

Competition use
As it is a rimless round, the 9×21mm is used in USPSA/IPSC competition in open class firearms.  A rimless case is preferred because, unlike semi-rimmed or rimmed cartridges, it will not tend to lock together with other rounds in a double-column magazine, resulting in a malfunction. As other .38 Super–based rimless cartridges became available, the 9×21mm decreased in popularity in the United States for competition use, but it is still widely used in many other parts of the world.

Synonyms
9×21mm IMI
9 mm IMI
9mm Italiano
Winchester 9×21mm WIN [124-gr. bullet]

Cartridge dimensions
The 9×21mm has 1.01 ml (15.5 grains H2O) cartridge case capacity.

9×21mm maximum C.I.P. cartridge dimensions All sizes in millimeters (mm).

The common rifling twist rate for this cartridge is 254 mm (1 in 10 in), 4 grooves, Ø lands = 8.79 mm, Ø grooves = 9.03 mm, land width = 3.80 mm and the primer type is small pistol.

According to the official C.I.P. (Commission Internationale Permanente pour l'épreuve des armes à feu portatives) guidelines, the 9×21mm case can handle up to  piezo pressure. In C.I.P. regulated countries every pistol cartridge combo has to be proofed at 130% of this maximum C.I.P. pressure to certify for sale to consumers.

See also
9 mm caliber
List of handgun cartridges
List of cartridges by caliber

References

Further reading
 

Pistol and rifle cartridges

Paramilitary cartridges